{{Speciesbox
|image=Solanum saccharoides NPS-1.jpg
|genus=Solanum
|species=sarrachoides
|authority=Sendtn.
|synonyms_ref=
 E.H.L.KrauseSolanum sarachidium BitterSolanum sarrachoides var. sarachidium (Bitter) C.V.MortonSolanum styleanum Dunal
}}Solanum sarrachoides is a species of South American nightshade known as the hairy nightshade or leafy-fruited nightshade.

The scientific name Solanum sarrachoides was long misused for a different species, Solanum physalifolium, by various authors. The original misidentified S. sarrachoides were held to be the variety S. physalifolium var. nitidibaccatum (also treated as distinct species, Solanum nitidibaccatum). The actual S. sarrachoides was also considered a variety of S. tweedianum, under this plant's obsolete name S. atriplicifolium, as established by Gilli based on Nees.S. sarrachoides'' occurs as an introduced species in the Southeastern United States and many other parts of the world.

References

sarrachoides